The Kootenai Inn was a building located in St. Maries, Idaho listed on the National Register of Historic Places.

The inn was built by the Chicago, Milwaukee, St. Paul and Pacific Railroad for its passengers and its workers. When timber and mineral interests in the area were tapped out and when people began leaving to take part in World War II activities, the population of the town was cut in half. The inn fell into poor condition and was vacant and a candidate for demolition by 1979. However, in March 1980, two couples bought the inn and started a restoration. The new owners salvaged materials from another hotel, the St. Maries, that was possibly built by the same contractor as the Kootenai Inn.

See also

 List of National Historic Landmarks in Idaho
 National Register of Historic Places listings in Benewah County, Idaho

References

1910 establishments in Idaho
Buildings and structures in Benewah County, Idaho
Hotel buildings completed in 1910
Hotel buildings on the National Register of Historic Places in Idaho
Native American history of Idaho
Tudor Revival architecture in Idaho
National Register of Historic Places in Benewah County, Idaho